The 2011 Curl Atlantic Championship was held from September 23 to 26 at the Tantramar Civic Centre in Sackville, New Brunswick. This was the first edition of the Curl Atlantic Championship. The goal of this event was to better prepare high performance Atlantic curling teams for the national and international stage. The winning men's team, skipped by James Grattan, will participate in the Perth Masters in Perth, Scotland, while the winning women's team, skipped by Suzanne Birt, will participate in the International Bernese Ladies Cup in Bern, Switzerland.

Men

Teams

Group A

Group B

Standings

Group A

Group B

Results

Draw 1
September 23, 8:00 AM AT

Draw 2
September 23 , 12:00 PM AT

Draw 3
September 23, 4:00 PM AT

Draw 4
September 23, 8:00 PM AT

Draw 5
September 24, 8:00 AM AT

Draw 6
September 24, 12:00 PM AT

Draw 7
September 24, 4:00 PM AT

Draw 8
September 24, 8:00 PM AT

Draw 9
September 25, 8:00 AM AT

Draw 10
September 25, 12:00 PM AT

Draw 11
September 25, 4:00 PM AT

Draw 12
September 25, 8:00 PM AT

Playoffs

Semifinals

A2 vs. B1
September 26, 9:00 AM AT

A1 vs. B2
September 26, 9:00 AM AT

Final
September 26, 1:00 PM AT

Women

Teams

Group A

Group B

Standings

Group A

Group B

Results

Draw 1
September 23, 8:00 AM AT

Draw 2
September 23 , 12:00 PM AT

Draw 3
September 23, 4:00 PM AT

Draw 4
September 23, 8:00 PM AT

Draw 5
September 24, 8:00 AM AT

Draw 6
September 24, 12:00 PM AT

Draw 7
September 24, 4:00 PM AT

Draw 8
September 24, 8:00 PM AT

Draw 9
September 25, 8:00 AM AT

Draw 10
September 25, 12:00 PM AT

Draw 11
September 25, 4:00 PM AT

Draw 12
September 25, 8:00 PM AT

Playoffs

Semifinals

A2 vs. B1
September 26, 9:00 AM AT

A1 vs. B2
September 26, 9:00 AM AT

Final
September 26, 1:00 PM AT

References

At
Sackville, New Brunswick
Curling competitions in New Brunswick
2011 in New Brunswick